A frontage road (also known as an access road, outer road, service road, feeder road, or parallel road) is a local road running parallel to a higher-speed, limited-access road. A frontage road is often used to provide access to private driveways, shops, houses, industries or farms. Where parallel high-speed roads are provided as part of a major highway, these are also known as local-express lanes. Sometimes a similar arrangement is used for city roads; for example, the collector portion of Commonwealth Avenue in Boston, Massachusetts, is known as a carriage road.

A frontage lane is a paved path that is used for the transportation and travel from one street to another. Frontage lanes, closely related to a frontage road, are common in metropolitan areas and in small rural towns. Frontage lanes are technically not classified as roads due to their purpose as a bridge from one road to another, and due to the architectural standards that they are not as wide as a standard road, or used as commonly as a standard road, street, or avenue.

Overview 

Frontage roads provide access to homes and businesses which would otherwise be cut off by a limited-access road and connect these locations with roads which have direct access to the main roadway.  Frontage roads give indirect access to abutting property along a freeway, either preventing the commercial disruption of an urban area that the freeway traverses or allowing commercial development of abutting property. At times, they add to the cost of building an expressway due to costs of land acquisition and the costs of paving and maintenance.

However, the benefits of developing nearby real estate can more than offset the cost of building the frontage roads. Furthermore, a frontage road may be a part of an older highway, so the expense of building a frontage road may be slight. And finally, the cost to purchase access rights from adjacent property may exceed the costs to build frontage roads.  Conversely, the existence of a frontage road can increase traffic on the main road and be a catalyst for development; hence there is sometimes an explicit decision made to not build a frontage road.

A backage road is a similar concept, but lies on the back side of the land parcels that abut the controlled access's right of way. Like the frontage road, it serves mainly to provide access to those parcels as an alternative to a frontage road.

Advantages 
There are several advantages to using frontage roads. One advantage is to separate local traffic from through traffic. When frontage roads are lacking in an urban area, the highway is used as a local road, reducing speeds and increasing congestion.
Another advantage occurs when the highway is closed or just obstructed. This pushes traffic off the highway. Where an urban area has frontage roads, the traffic can easily bypass the obstruction or closure on the frontage road. Where an urban area has no frontage road, traffic is diverted onto and congests local roads, since there is no formal (frontage road) alternative.

Disadvantages 
There are also some disadvantages to using frontage roads. When frontage roads are used without controlling the access to the primary road, at every intersection where an intersecting road runs across the primary, the number of conflict points increases one fold for each frontage road, since each frontage road is itself another intersection. A highway with frontage roads can be difficult for pedestrians to cross, for a variety of reasons including, but not limited to when neither the primary road nor the crossing is elevated, or gaps in traffic are few and the intervals between those gaps is long. Such examples include:

 US 190 in East Baton Rouge Parish, Louisiana;
 LA 1 in West Baton Rouge Parish, Louisiana;
 Palatine Road in Cook County, Illinois;
 The northeast edge of Spur 503 in Denison, Texas;
 The Southeast edge of U.S. Route 69 in McAlester, Oklahoma.

A complex example is US 77/Commerce in Ardmore, Oklahoma, particularly at the Grand Avenue intersection. Right turns from the central carriageways are not allowed; a slip ramp must be taken to the two-way frontage road, where the turning traffic must yield to the through traffic. Only then can a vehicle make a right turn from the signal on the frontage road.

Furthermore, frontage roads can increase urban sprawl. Land along highways is made open for development, allowing shopping centers and other buildings to sprawl.

Collector–express

The successor to the concept of service/frontage roads in urban freeways is the collector–express system, which is designed to handle closely spaced interchange ramps without disrupting through traffic.  Unlike service roads, the collector lanes are typically high-speed full controlled-access lanes, conforming to freeway requirements.

The collector lanes may also be known as a collector/distributor road and slip ramps provide access to and from the express/mainline lanes. Frontage roads may feed into and from collector/distributor roads near some interchanges.

Examples

Argentina
In Argentina, especially around Buenos Aires, frontage roads known as colectoras can be found next to freeways. Examples include Avenida General Paz, Ruta 8, and Ruta 9 coming into Buenos Aires.

Canada 

Ontario:
A freeway with a significant remaining network of service roads is the Queen Elizabeth Way (QEW). However, most of the slip ramps between St. Catharines and Mississauga were removed during major reconstruction in the 1970s and 1990s.  Service roads are no longer able to directly access the QEW; they have been rerouted to intersections with other major roads which have interchanges with the QEW. Nonetheless, the service roads are positioned too close to the QEW to easily widen the freeway unless all the private properties along the service road are bought out.  This would be unlikely in the current political environment.

The only remaining slip ramps connecting to service roads are on the QEW running through St. Catharines. These dangerous low-standard ramps (due to lack of acceleration/deceleration lanes) are due to be replaced in a planned extensive reconstruction of the QEW that is currently underway.  Similar service roads and slip ramps exist along Highway 401 through Oshawa, but like through St. Catharines, these are also in the process of being replaced with modern ramps.

Highway 427 had its service roads replaced with a collector-express system in the 1970s. However, it has several RIRO access onramps and offramps to serve residential traffic in addition to its standard parclo interchanges with major arterials.

List of service roads on the QEW:

 series of broken sections from Cawthra Road in Mississauga to the Garden City Skyway in St. Catharines.

List of service roads on the 403:

 North Service Road at QEW/407 junction to Waterdown Rd, Burlington
 Service Road at Guelph Line, Burlington

List of RIRO on the 427:

 Gibbs Road onto North 427
 Eva Road onto/off South 427
 Holiday Drive onto/off South 427
 Eringate Drive onto/off South 427
 Valhalla Inn Road onto North 427

Quebec: Many autoroutes in the Montreal area (including the A-40, A-520, A-13, A-15 and A-25) maintain networks of frontage roads along at least some of their lengths as they pass through urban/developing areas.

Mexico
In Guadalajara, the López Mateos, Vallarta and Mariano Otero avenues (the latter in the stretch between López Mateos to Niños Héroes) are two-lane avenues surrounded by two one-way frontage roads. Lázaro Cárdenas Expressway is similar, but with three lanes in both the central road and the frontage roads. Because these frontage roads are considered as part of the avenue itself, the central road is known locally as the "central lanes", whereas the frontage roads are known as "lateral lanes". Turns are always forbidden in the central lanes; drivers wishing to make a turn must leave the central lanes and make the turn from the lateral lanes.

Netherlands
Frontage roads are common in the Netherlands and detailed in the Dutch national design manual for bicycle traffic as per pages 121 and 127 where they are referred to as parallel roads. In the Netherlands, engineers have used frontage roads to benefit cyclists as well as automobiles. Because frontage roads only carry local traffic, the speed on these roads is low (their speed limit is 30 km/h), making them an ideal environment for bicyclists. Because the speed and volume is so low, no additional treatments are needed to make a service road a safe bike facility. In the Netherlands, service roads are often linked together with bike paths to help create a comprehensive bicycle route, with the bike path links serving as barriers to through motor traffic. Since service roads serve a dual purpose, they are an inexpensive way to create routes in cycling network, compared to cycletracks or stand-alone bike paths. Extensive amounts of information on frontage roads can be found on Northeastern's webpage.

Mainland China 
In the People's Republic of China mainland, roads running next to expressways, taking outgoing traffic and feeding incoming traffic, are called either service roads or auxiliary roads (fudao locally). Where expressways cross larger urban areas, such frontage roads may run next to the expressway itself. Much of the Beijing portion of the Jingkai Expressway, for example, has, in fact, China National Highway 106 acting as a split-direction frontage road. Many newer urban highways are entirely elevated, with parallel access roads running beneath the entire length.

Philippines

Expressways 
The North Luzon Expressway maintains two-way service roads that run along both sides of the expressway within Metro Manila limits, which extend from exits and merge into local roads.

To the south, the South Luzon Expressway's Metro Manila Skyway and Pres. Sergio Osmeña Sr. Highway segments (both are apparently local and express roads) has two two-way service roads and the PNR running alongside the road. The tracks are between the East Service Road and the highway, giving access to train stations from Pasay Road railway station to Bicutan railway station. The service roads begin at Gil Puyat Avenue up until the Filinvest City exit.

Other roads 
Other major roads in the country with two-way service roads include Roxas Boulevard, which service roads catering to local establishments along the thoroughfare. The East Service Road runs from Kalaw Avenue in Ermita, Manila to C. Rivera Street in Pasay while the shorter West Service Road runs from Vicente Sotto Street to Gil Puyat Avenue within Bay City.

Ortigas Avenue in Greenhills, San Juan contains two service roads. The eastbound one-way service roads from Roosevelt Street to Wilson Street, and from Wilson Street to Connecticut Street provide access to establishments along the road while serving as bus stops for bus routes along Ortigas Avenue. A westbound one-way service road from Connecticut Street to Club Filipino Avenue is primarily a local-express road setup which distributes traffic to the Greenhills Shopping Center and pass-through traffic along Ortigas Avenue.

Quezon Avenue in Quezon City runs an eastbound one-way service road from West Avenue and East Avenue to its intersection with EDSA.

Hong Kong 
Frontage roads exist both in city and along major expressways between new towns. Gloucester Road has frontage road running parallel of it from east to west. Cheung Tung Road serves as the frontage road for North Lantau Highway, Hiram's Highway for New Hiram's Highway, and Tai Wo Service Road West and Tai Wo Service Road East for Fanling Highway. Castle Peak Road serves the purpose as a frontage road of Tuen Mun Road to some extent.

India 

In India, frontage roads or Service lanes (sometimes called नल्ला "Nullah" in Hindi) exist on most high density dual carriageway roads and dual carriageway highways. On Access controlled Expressways like the Yamuna Expressway, the frontage roads remain separate from the main carriageway throughout the road's length. Retrofitted and previously non-access controlled roads, such as most National Highways, only have service lanes on stretches where fly-overs (overpasses) are built over junctions or through towns.

United States 
Alaska

Though Alaska has very few roads that are built to freeway standard, a couple of the highways that are do have frontage roads; notably along the Seward Highway (Alaska Route 1) with Homer Drive running south (from Tudor Road to Dimond Boulevard) and Brayton Drive running north (from DeArmoun Road to Tudor Road); and the Minnesota Drive Expressway (from West 100th Ave to Dimond Boulevard) in South Anchorage. Also, the George Parks Highway (Alaska Route 3) has two-way frontage roads running along it from the Trunk Road exit to the Seward Meridian Parkway exit (Fireweed Road on the south side and Blue Lupine Drive on the north side) in Wasilla.

Arizona
Frontage roads are not very common in Arizona but do exist along certain freeways.

In metropolitan Phoenix, the state's first freeway, Interstate 17 has a frontage road (Black Canyon Highway); some sections of the frontage road was reduced to a single lane in the 1990s when I-17 was widened. Several freeways overbuilt existing arterials, which were converted to frontage roads: Price Road (Tempe), Pima Road (Scottsdale) and Beardsley Road (north Phoenix) on the Loop 101, as well as 59th Avenue on the Loop 202 Ed Pastor (South Mountain) Freeway. In Tucson, I-10 has a two-lane, one-way frontage road, and in between Casa Grande and Tucson, a two-lane, two-way frontage road.

California
The East Shore Freeway, a wrong-way concurrency of 80 and 580 in Berkeley and Emeryville, is served by a frontage which retains the name of the previous road that ran through the corridor: the Eastshore Highway. It is also served by another frontage on the other side of the freeway: West Frontage Road.

Interstate 210 in California near Pasadena and Arcadia has frontage roads which include Corson Street in Pasadena (parallel to I-210 West) and Maple Street (parallel to I-210 East) in Pasadena, while Central Avenue (parallel to I-210 West) and Evergreen Avenue (parallel to I-210 East) are in Arcadia.

In Orange County, frontage roads exist on sections of these four highways:
 Interstate 5 (Santa Ana Freeway) between Anaheim Boulevard and State College Boulevard in Anaheim.  The northbound frontage road is Anaheim Way and the southbound frontage road is Manchester Avenue.
 California State Highway 55 (Costa Mesa Freeway) from its southern terminus north of 19th Street up to Bristol Street in Costa Mesa  Both the northbound and southbound frontage roads are signed as Newport Boulevard.
 California State Highway 73 (Corona del Mar Freeway) from Red Hill Avenue to Jamboree Road in Newport Beach.  Both the northbound and southbound frontage roads are signed as Bristol Street.
The expressway section of Jamboree Road from Edinger Avenue to the start of the SR 261 Toll Road in Irvine.

Illinois
Frontage roads are common in Chicago, where they usually have the name of the street in its place had before the adjacent expressway was constructed. Parts of the Edens Expressway, the Dan Ryan Expressway, the Eisenhower Expressway, and the Kennedy Expressway use frontage roads. In addition, the stretches of Interstate 290 and the Elgin–O'Hare Expressway in Schaumburg have frontage roads.

Massachusetts
Service roads are relatively uncommon in much of New England, and in Boston in particular, largely due to resistance to expressway construction, which necessitated scaled-back rights of way.  Still, some unique examples of the type exist in the Rose Fitzgerald Kennedy Greenway Surface Road, Cross street, and Atlantic Avenue in downtown Boston. As a result of the Big Dig, the carriageways of these streets were re-aligned to function as a two-way service road system through downtown Boston with the Rose Kennedy Greenway park system as their 'median', and the expressway underground.  In this special case of a service road, the subterranean I-93 Central Artery expressway is not visible from the surface, but accessible through access ramps into the tunnel system. Just south of downtown, I-93 also includes a short section at-grade service road between exits 16 in South Boston and the I-90 interchange south of Chinatown, in a more typical arrangement of the concept. Typical service roads also exist along the eight-lane freeway section of Massachusetts Route 2 through Arlington and Belmont (two near northwestern suburbs of Boston) and United States Route 1 in Lynnfield.

Michigan
Frontage roads are also common in Metro Detroit, where they are usually referred to as "service drives." As in Texas, they typically run one-way with frequent slip ramps to and from the limited-access roadway, with Texas U-turns at or near many intersections. Unlike Texas, there is usually little commercial development situated along the frontage road itself (see example); the road serves to provide access to the freeway from existing residential streets and commercial surface thoroughfares. Also unlike in many locales in urban Texas, where an exit ramp may actually precede the entrance ramp for the previous interchange to facilitate access to businesses situated directly on the frontage road (in effect, the two interchanges overlap along the frontage road), Michigan slip ramps to and from frontage roads are generally positioned as they normally would be in the absence of the frontage road. Motorists entering and exiting the freeway are not sharing the frontage road simultaneously to as large a degree, reducing weaving. Access to the frontage road between exits is provided by turnarounds and frequent bridging, generally every 1/2 mile, between exits.

Michigan left hand turns are also quite common at surface street-frontage road intersections, with dedicated turnaround lanes (similar to the Texas U-turn) built over the freeway on separate bridges approximately 100 meters from the main intersection and bridging.

With the exceptions of Interstate 275 and the freeway portion of M-53, every Metro Detroit freeway has a frontage road along it for at least a portion of its length. Several other freeways outside Metro Detroit use these as well.

There are two other cities in Michigan where frontage roads running more than one mile in length outside of Metro Detroit can be found. There are frontage roads along Interstate 496 and U.S. Route 127 in Greater Lansing and along Interstate 475 in Downtown Flint. Outside the cities, US-23 has them from Ann Arbor to Fenton, while US-127 has them from Leslie to Mason. New freeway construction in Michigan has not included frontage roads since the completion of Interstate 696, most of which was constructed along the rights of way of major surface arteries, in 1989. Michigan does not build frontage roads in rural areas.

Missouri
Missouri has built frontage roads, typically named "Outer Roads", along Interstate 44 (when it was designated as US 66) between Springfield and Greater St. Louis and along US 67 (not all of it up to freeway standards) between Festus and Poplar Bluff.  Outer roads are also found on Interstate 64 in West St. Louis County, Interstate 270 in North St. Louis County, and Missouri Highway 367 between I-270 and Lindbergh Blvd.

Montana
Along Interstate 15, most rural sections of the former US 91 are still in service as frontage roads between Lima and Butte, Butte and Helena, Helena and Great Falls, and from Great Falls north to Shelby.

Some former sections of US 10 in the west (Saint Regis to Butte along Interstate 90) and east (Billings to North Dakota along Interstate 94) also serve as frontage roads.

New Jersey

While service roads are somewhat uncommon on most New Jersey highways (as they use a "Stroad" design), they do exist. In northern New Jersey, Route 3 has several service roads throughout much of its length, due in part to the heavy commercial development in the area. Notably, commuters will often use these service roads to get ahead of regular traffic back ups, often causing accidents which lead to the shut down of said service roads, defeating their purpose. Frontage Roads are also used on Route 24 in Short Hills where Route 124 serves as a service road for about 2 miles. The Garden State Parkway also has a service road in Irvington for a distance.

New Mexico

New York
One-way service roads on either sides of highways are relatively common in New York City and the surrounding areas. Due to the high urban density, this design allows rapid access on and off the highway while also providing a viable alternate route in the case of accidents and traffic. In the borough of Queens, the Van Wyck Expressway has this system implemented for most of its length. On Long Island, the Long Island Expressway (Interstate 495), has one-way service roads on each side of the expressway for most of its length from the Queens–Midtown Tunnel to Riverhead.

North and South Carolina
Service roads can be found alongside interstate highways in North Carolina and South Carolina. Some of these roads have houses facing the highways which they parallel. They may also have highway service, as most of them are located near interchanges. Most service roads in the Carolinas do not have ramps leading to and from their respective highways; rather, as mentioned before, most are located near interchanges, which allows people to exit the highway and go around to the frontage road if needed. Those service roads are also commonly used as roads for farms and their products.

Texas

This was far more than any other state. The state government's obsession with always building frontage roads alongside major highways is credited to chief highway engineer Dewitt Greer (1940–1968). He started building frontage roads as a measure to reduce right-of-way acquisition costs by ensuring access to new highways for affected landowners; otherwise, the state would have needed to pay them a higher price for cutting off access to their land. 

Most Texas freeways have service roads on both sides.  In urban and suburban areas, the traffic typically travels one-way, in the direction of the adjacent freeway.  Most other areas have two-way traffic, but as an area urbanizes, the frontage road is often converted to one-way traffic (2 lanes). In cases of freeway congestion or shutdown, the frontage road provides an instant detour, subject to delays at each stop sign or stoplight at cross streets.

Where two new Texas freeways meet, especially on the edge of major metropolitan areas, the state will often first build the junctions for the one-way frontage roads—that is, four at-grade intersections—followed by an overpass where one freeway crosses over another.  This requires motorists who desire to switch freeways to exit to the adjacent frontage road, turn at an at-grade intersection onto the frontage road for the other freeway, and then merge into the other freeway.  As traffic increases at the at-grade intersections, the state slowly adds direct ramps between freeways for the most in-demand traffic movements, thereby reducing such inconvenience for motorists.

Over 80% of Houston freeways have service roads, which locals typically call feeders.  Many service roads in urban and suburban areas of Texas have the convenience of Texas U-turns, as a left lane curving under an overpass, allowing drivers to avoid stopping for traffic lights when making a U-turn.

Service roads are often built as part of a multi-phase plan to construct new limited-access highways.  They initially serve as a highway with access to local business before the freeway is constructed years later. After the completion of the freeway, frontage roads serve as a major thoroughfare for local activity, such as with the Katy Freeway project (I-10) in Greater Houston.  In several cases, a long-range plan has called for a future freeway, but the design has either changed or the project was canceled before completion.

Nicknames for frontage roads vary within the state of Texas. In Houston and East Texas, they are called feeders. Dallas and Fort Worth area residents call their frontage roads "service roads", and "access roads" is the predominant term used in San Antonio. Most signs reference "Frontage Road" despite local regional vernacular (there are signs in Houston that use the term "feeder").

In Houston, the free sections of Beltway 8, SH 249 and FM 1093, not part of the Sam Houston Tollway, Tomball Tollway, and Fort Bend Westpark Tollway (respectively) are composed of frontage roads.

In 2002, the Texas Department of Transportation proposed to discontinue building frontage roads on new freeways, citing studies that suggest frontage roads increase congestion. However, this proposal was widely ridiculed and criticized and was dropped later the same year.

The Stemmons Freeway in Dallas illustrates the practicability of the frontage road: the real estate developer John Stemmons offered free land to the Texas Highway commission in which to build a freeway (Interstate 35E) on the condition that the state build the freeway with frontage roads that would give access to undeveloped property that he owned along the freeway corridor. The state was able to reduce its costs (largely the cost of land acquisition) of building the freeway, and didn't need to acquire and demolish developed property; the developer profited from development along the freeway. San Antonio developer Charles Martin Wender used the same tactic for his Westover Hills development, offering free land through the middle of his property for SH 151 as well as paying half the costs for the initial frontage road construction.  Following Wender's lead, several neighboring landowners also donated right-of-way for the route.

Washington
Frontage roads are found in Spokane along a segment of Interstate 90 between its interchange with SR 290 and the exit for East Appleway Boulevard.  West of South Havana Street, the westbound frontage road is East Second Avenue and the eastbound frontage road is East Third Avenue.  East of South Havana Street, the westbound frontage road is East Third Avenue and the eastbound frontage road is East Fourth Avenue.

See also

References

Road infrastructure
Types of roads
Limited-access roads

de:Anschlussstelle (Autobahn)#Frontage Road